Government College of Arts and Science, Aurangabad, is an undergraduate and postgraduate, coeducational college situated in Aurangabad, Maharashtra. It was established in the year 1923. This is the first college in Marathwada region. The college is affiliated with Dr. Babasaheb Ambedkar Marathwada University.

Departments

Science
Physics
Mathematics
Chemistry
Statistics
Electronics
Botany
Microbiology
Zoology
Computer Science

Arts and Commerce
Marathi
English
Hindi
Urdu
Sanskrit
History
Political Science
Psychology
Economics
Sociology
Commerce

Accreditation
The college is  recognized by the University Grants Commission (UGC).

References

External links

Dr. Babasaheb Ambedkar Marathwada University
Universities and colleges in Maharashtra
Educational institutions established in 1923
1923 establishments in India